Whitchurch Alport Football Club is an English football club based in Whitchurch, Shropshire.

History
The club were formed in 1946 in the football season that followed World War II, being named after Alport Farm in Alport Road, Whitchurch, which had been the home of Coley Maddocks, a local footballer who had been killed in action in the war. They joined the Shrewsbury and District League, spending two seasons in the league, winning the title in their second season. In 1948 they were briefly elected as members of the Birmingham League, before becoming founder members of the Mid-Cheshire League.

In 1974 they became the last English team to take the Welsh Amateur Cup out of Wales prior to its becoming the Welsh Intermediate Cup, defeating Cardiff College of Education 2–1 at Latham Park, Newtown.

They were admitted to the North West Counties Football League Division One from the Mercian Regional Football League in 2015.

On 24 September 2019, Alport lifted the Shropshire Senior Cup for the first time – defeating reigning champions Shrewsbury Town 3–1 in the final at New Meadow. At the end of the 2020–21 season the club were transferred to the Premier Division of the Midland League.

Ground
The club play at Yockings Park. The dressing rooms were constructed from wooden packing crates acquired from the Military Camp at Prees Heath shortly after the end of World War II.

Honours
Mid-Cheshire League
Winners 1969–70
Runners-up 1949–50, 1954–55, 1970–71, 1977–78
Shrewsbury & District League
Winners 1947–48
Welsh Amateur Cup/Welsh Intermediate Cup
Winners 1973–74
Runners-up 1958–59, 1976–77
Shropshire County Cup
Winners 1969–70, 1997–98
Runners-up 1995–96
Shropshire County FA Huddersfield Cup
Winners 2018–19
Shropshire Senior Cup
Winners 2019

See also
Whitchurch Alport F.C. players

References

External links

 
Football clubs in England
North West Counties Football League clubs
Whitchurch, Shropshire
Football clubs in Shropshire
Association football clubs established in 1946
1946 establishments in England
Midland Football League